Sven Hoffmeister (born 13 October 1970) is a German former footballer who played as a goalkeeper. He is now goalkeeper coach of FSV Mainz 05.

External links

1970 births
Living people
German footballers
Association football goalkeepers
KSV Hessen Kassel players
SV Wehen Wiesbaden players
1. FSV Mainz 05 players
1. FSV Mainz 05 II players
Kickers Emden players
SSV Reutlingen 05 players
SV Sandhausen players
3. Liga players
Footballers from Hanover